George Curtis may refer to:

Sports
George Curtis (cricketer) (1837–1885), Australian cricketer
George Curtis (greyhound trainer) (1923–2020), British greyhound trainer
George Curtis (footballer, born 1919) (1919–2004), footballer with Arsenal F.C. and Southampton F.C., and Norway national football team manager
George Curtis (footballer, born 1939) (1939–2021), footballer and manager, most notably with Coventry City F.C.

Politics
George M. Curtis (Iowa politician) (1844–1921), U.S. Representative from Iowa
George M. Curtis (New York politician), member of the New York State Assembly
George Curtis (Australian politician) (1845–1922), Australian politician
George Curtis (Union spy) during the American Civil War
George Curtis Moore (1925–1973), American diplomat

Others
George F. Curtis (1906–2005), founding dean of the University of British Columbia Faculty of Law
George William Curtis (1824–1892), American writer and public speaker
George Ticknor Curtis (1812–1894), American author, historian and lawyer

See also
George Washington Parke Custis (1781–1857), American antiquarian and author